Arthur Eugene (Gene) Henn  (June 5, 1940 – March 28, 2001) was a vice admiral in the United States Coast Guard who served as the 19th Vice Commandant from 1994 to 1996. He was previously Chief, Office of Marine Safety, Security and Environmental Protection. He graduated from the United States Coast Guard Academy in 1962 and also attended the University of Michigan (combined master of science degrees in naval architecture, marine engineering and metallurgical engineering) and United States Army War College.

Henn was married to Susan Frances Pedretti of Cincinnati, Ohio and had two children. His awards include the Distinguished Service Medal, Legion of Merit, two Meritorious Service Medals, four Coast Guard Commendation Medals, the Coast Guard Achievement Medal, Coast Guard Unit Commendations, the Coast Guard Meritorious Unit Commendation, and two Coast Guard Commandant's Letter of Commendation Ribbons. Henn died in 2001 at the age of 60 and is buried at Arlington National Cemetery.

References

United States Coast Guard admirals
Vice Commandants of the United States Coast Guard
1940 births
2001 deaths
University of Michigan College of Engineering alumni
United States Coast Guard Academy alumni
United States Army War College alumni
Burials at Arlington National Cemetery